The 1974 Dartmouth Big Green football team was an American football team that represented Dartmouth College during the 1974 NCAA Division I football season. Following a five-year run of consecutive Ivy League championships, the Big Green dropped to a tie for fifth place.

In their fourth season under head coach Jake Crouthamel, the Big Green compiled a 3–6 record and were outscored 115 to 103. Brian Wroczynski and Thomas Snickenberger were the team captains.

The Big Green's 3–4 conference record tied for fifth place in the Ivy League standings. Dartmouth outscored Ivy opponents 100 to 87.

Dartmouth played its home games at Memorial Field on the college campus in Hanover, New Hampshire. The college's sports teams had long been referred to as "the Green" or "Big Green", after their uniform colors, in addition to their primary nickname of "Dartmouth Indians". In 1974, the college trustees ruled "use of the [Indian] symbol in any form to be inconsistent with present institutional and academic objectives of the college in advancing Native American education.". The 1974 football season was the first in which the team used "Dartmouth Big Green" as its official nickname.

Schedule

References

Dartmouth
Dartmouth Big Green football seasons
Dartmouth Big Green football